Malhargarh is a town (a nagar parishad) and a tehsil in Mandsaur district in the Indian state of Madhya Pradesh. It is located between Neemuch and Mandsaur on the Ratlam- Chittaurgarh Section of Indian railway. Malhargarh is rich in agriculture and part of the Malwa region.

Demographics
 India census, Malhargarh had a population of 12,000. Males constitute 51% of the population and females 49%. Malhargarh has an average literacy rate of 73%, higher than the national average of 59.55%: male literacy is 81%, and female literacy is 64%. In Malhargarh, 14% of the population is under 6 years of age.

Transport

By train

References

Cities and towns in Mandsaur district